Joseph Scott Beauchamp (April 11, 1944May 20, 2020) was an American professional football player who was a defensive back for the San Diego Chargers. He played college football at Iowa State University before playing professionally for the Chargers in the American Football League from 1966 through 1969 and in the National Football League from 1970 through 1975.

His three interceptions against the Denver Broncos on September 24, 1972, is tied for the Chargers' single-game record.

Beauchamp died at age 76 on May 20, 2020.

See also
List of American Football League players

References

1944 births
2020 deaths
San Diego Chargers players
Iowa State Cyclones football players
Players of American football from Chicago
American Football League players